The 2013 Belk Bowl was an American college football bowl game that was played on December 28, 2013, at Bank of America Stadium in Charlotte, North Carolina.  It was one of the 2013–14 bowl games that concluded the 2013 FBS football season.  The twelfth edition of the Belk Bowl, it featured the Cincinnati Bearcats of the American Athletic Conference against the North Carolina Tar Heels of the Atlantic Coast Conference.  It began at 3:20 p.m. EST and aired on ESPN.  The game was sponsored by the Belk department store company.  North Carolina defeated Cincinnati by a score of 39–17.

The Bearcats accepted their invitation after earning a 9–3 record for the season, while the Tar Heels accepted their bid after going 6–6 on the season.

Teams

Cincinnati Bearcats

The Bearcats continued their winning ways in the American Athletic Conference, finishing at 9–3 overall and 6–2 in the American.  After a 31–24 overtime defeat at home against the rival Louisville Cardinals (which saw Louisville retain The Keg of Nails for the foreseeable future), bowl director Will Webb extended an invitation to play in the game.

This will be Cincinnati's second consecutive (and overall) Belk Bowl; the Bearcats had previously won the game in 2012, defeating the Duke Blue Devils by a score of 48–34.  It will also end the Belk Bowl's six-year partnership with The American (formerly the Big East, as that tie-in will go to the Southeastern Conference from 2014 through at least 2019.

North Carolina Tar Heels

College football analyst Phil Steele and CBS Sports writer Jerry Palm (as of December 6) projected that the Tar Heels would be the other team invited to play in the game.  This was confirmed on December 8.

The Tar Heels are only the sixth team since the regular season expanded to 12 games in 2006 to start the season 1–5 and be invited to a bowl.  They reeled off five consecutive wins, including four straight conference wins, to become bowl eligible.  This will be North Carolina's fourth appearance in what is now the Belk Bowl.  They previously appeared in the game in 2004 (losing to Boston College), 2008 (losing to West Virginia) and 2009 (losing to Pittsburgh).  The 2004 appearance came when the bowl was known as the Continental Tire Bowl; the 2008 and 2009 appearances came when it was the Meineke Car Care Bowl.  The Tar Heels have accounted for two of the largest crowds in the bowl's history.  The 2008 game attracted a crowd of 73,712, the most in the bowl's history.  The 2004 game attracted a crowd of 70,412.  Charlotte is only two hours south of Chapel Hill, and the Tar Heels have a large alumni and fan base in the area.

Game summary

First quarter
After receiving the opening kickoff, the Tar Heels of North Carolina (UNC) went three-and-out and punted, but on the return, Cincinnati's (CINCY) Anthony McClung fumbled the return, giving UNC the ball back and the CINCY 34.  However, UNC was forced to settle for a 40-yard field goal try that Thomas Moore missed. CINCY took possession of the ball at their own 23-yard line, and achieved a first down before a sack that lost 18 yards decimated the drive, and they ultimately punted. UNC was first to the scoreboard on their subsequent drive, scoring on a 2-yard touchdown run by Romar Morris after 11 plays for 68 yards. CINCY failed to execute on their next drive, punting, and UNC's Ryan Switzer returned the punt for 33 yards (the punt went 34 yards), but the return was called back due to a holding penalty, negating the Tar Heels' good field position, instead putting them back at their own 35-yard line. On UNC's ensuing drive, they went three-and-out, and during the drive, senior offensive lineman James Hurst went down with an apparent left leg injury, exiting the game; UNC punted. The punt pinned CINCY inside their own 10-yard line, and on their possession, linebacker Kareem Martin and ram back Brandon Ellerbe sacked quarterback Brendon Kay in the end zone for a safety. UNC returner T. J. Logan returned the ensuing free kick 78 yards for a touchdown, making the score 16–0, UNC. CINCY started their subsequent drive at their own 35-yard line after the kickoff went out of bounds. At the end of the first quarter, they were amidst a drive, approaching the red zone.

Second quarter
CINCY kicker Tony Miliano, who entered the attempt having made just 6 of 15 attempts on the season, made a 34-yard field goal attempt within the first minute of the quarter to make the score 16–3. After that, UNC once again embarked on a long drive that lasted 12 plays for 76 yards and 4:01 and culminated with a Jack Tabb 3-yard touchdown reception from Marquise Williams, making the score 23–3. Later in the quarter, Miliano missed a 46-yard field goal attempt, and subsequently the teams exchanged punts. UNC punted on their next drive after failing to convert a third and ten, instead losing five yards to knock them out of field goal range; the punt was downed at the CINCY 6-yard line. CINCY did not attempt to score particularly vigorously, not running any pass plays, and ultimately heading into the half trailing by 20.

Third quarter
Cincinnati received the opening kickoff of the second half, and exclusively ran the ball on the first several plays of the drive, even to the extent that Shaq Washington replaced Kay at quarterback, the latter of whom lined up at wide receiver; on third down and nine, however, Kay returned to quarterback on a passing play, but was sacked for the fifth time of the game, and the Bearcats were forced to punt, and Switzer tied the NCAA-record with his fifth punt return touchdown of the season, recording an 86-yard touchdown; the extra point was no good. CINCY finally scored a touchdown on their subsequent drive, via a 15-yard rush by Ralph Abernathy, making the score 29–10. On the ensuing kickoff, CINCY kicked the ball out of bounds, setting up UNC with solid field position at their own 35-yard line. Early in the drive Eric Ebron, hurdled a defender and hit the ground hard, but quickly re-entered the game, and caught another pass just a few plays later. Later in the drive, Switzer made a catch that converted a fourth down in the red zone; moments later, Morris rushed for a 1-yard touchdown. This time, the extra point was good to culminate a 13-play, 65-yard drive that encapsulated 4:36. CINCY's ensuing drive stalled, and they punted; Switzer made a fair catch. In the waning seconds of the quarter, CINCY entered the red zone.

Fourth quarter
Utilizing the wildcat formation, Shaq Washington rushed for a touchdown within the first minute of the final quarter of play, pulling the Bearcats within 19. On the ensuing kickoff, CINCY recovered a fumble from T. J. Logan, fueling momentum for the Bearcats, who started at the 6-yard line. They started in the wildcat, but when faced with third and goal at the eight-yard line, Kay returned at quarterback and completed a pass, but it was short of the end zone; the Bearcats went for it on fourth down, and Kay threw a pass that bounced off the hands of his intended target, and thus, they turned the ball over. Looking to milk the clock on their ensuing drive, UNC achieved a first down prior to losing six yards on a rush to set up third down and long; a pass interference bailed them out on the third and long play, as though the pass was incomplete, the 15-yard penalty gave them an automatic first down. They succeeded in their endeavor to drain time from the clock, ultimately executing a 14-play drive that gained 74 yards and lasted 9:19, and culminated with a 40-yard field goal to complete the scoring.

Scoring summary

Statistics

References

Belk Bowl
Duke's Mayo Bowl
Cincinnati Bearcats football bowl games
North Carolina Tar Heels football bowl games
Belk Bowl
December 2013 sports events in the United States